Höxter-Ottbergen is a railway station located in Ottbergen, Germany. The station is located on the Eggebahn and the Sollingbahn railway lines. The train services are operated by NordWestBahn.

Train services
The station is served by the following services:

Local services  Paderborn - Altenbegen - Höxter-Ottbergen - Holzminden - Kreiensen
Local services  Höxter-Ottbergen – Bad Karlshafen – Bodenfelde – Göttingen

References

Railway stations in North Rhine-Westphalia
Railway stations in Germany opened in 1861
Buildings and structures in Höxter (district)